Kvilda is a municipality and village in Prachatice District in the South Bohemian Region of the Czech Republic. It has about 100 inhabitants. It is also one of the coldest places in the country.

Administrative parts
Hamlets of Bučina, Františkov, Hraběcí Huť and Vydří Most are administrative parts of Kvilda.

Geography
It lies in the Bohemian Forest and in the Šumava National Park.

The sources of the longest Czech river Vltava are located in the municipality. The territory is rich in small watercourses. In the northern part of the municipality there is the  large moor Jezerní slať.

Climate

Kvilda enjoys a version of wet Subarctic climate (Dfc) with cold and wet conditions year round. The municipality, specifically the moor Jezerní slať and its weather station named Perla, holds several temperature records. The lowest measured temperature is  recorded on 30th January 1987. It also holds the record of the highest average of below-zero days per annum, which is 252 days. The total annual amount of precipitation is up to 1,300 mm. The station Perla has been in operation since October 1985.

The average number of days with snow cover is 150.

History
The first written mention of Kvilda is from 1569. Most of the population were ethnic Germans. After the World War II, the German inhabitants were expelled.

Sights
The Church of Saint Stephan was built in 1892–1894 and replaced an old wooden church destroyed by fire.

On the edge of Jezerní slať there is a lookout tower and an educational trail.

References

External links

 

Villages in Prachatice District
Bohemian Forest